Salah Bey is a town and commune in Sétif Province in north-eastern Algeria. The town is named after Salah Bey,  the bey of Constantine from 1771 to 1792.

References

Communes of Sétif Province
Cities in Algeria